Vyacheslav Anatolyevich Dergachyov (born 1 July 2001) is a Belarusian professional footballer who plays for BATE Borisov.

Honours
BATE Borisov
Belarusian Cup winner: 2020–21
Belarusian Super Cup winner: 2022

References

External links 
 
 

2001 births
Living people
Belarusian footballers
Association football goalkeepers
FC BATE Borisov players